Ghosting: The Spirit of Christmas is a 2019 American Christmas fantasy romantic comedy television film. Directed by Therersa Bennett and written by Laura Donney, the film stars Aisha Dee, Kimiko Glenn, Kendrick Sampson, Jazz Raycole, Missi Pyle, and LisaGay Hamilton.

Plot
Following the best first date of her life, Jess is preoccupied with texting. She dies while texting, and wakes up as a ghost. She has to settle unfinished business. With the help of her best friend Kara (Kimiko Glenn), they embark on a hilarious, bittersweet and final adventure, so that Jess can ascend to the afterlife.

Cast
 Aisha Dee as Jess, a young woman who dies and has to settle unfinish business
 Kimiko Glenn as Kara, Jess' best friend who can see her as a ghost
 Kendrick Sampson as Ben, Jess' ongoing boyfriend who can also see her as a ghost
 Jazz Raycole as Mae, Ben's sister and Kara's ongoing girlfriend
 Missi Pyle as Chrissy, a lifestyle guru
 LisaGay Hamilton as Deb, Jess' mother

Release
The film premiered on Freeform on December 4, 2019.

Reception
The film was met with positive reviews, praising the performances, the concept, and romance.

Christopher Ross of Glamour call it "the wildest, most delightful holiday movie you'll watch this year." Jamie Primeau of Cosmopolitan says that "the movie has all the key ingredients for made-for-TV Christmas movie magic: absurdity, romance, friendship, drama, and just the right amount of cheesiness."

References

External links
 Ghosting: The Spirit of Christmas on Internet Movie Database
 Ghosting: The Spirit of Christmas on Freeform

2019 romantic comedy films
2019 television films
2019 LGBT-related films
2019 films
2010s Christmas films
2019 fantasy films
2010s ghost films
Freeform (TV channel) original programming
2010s English-language films
American romantic comedy films
Christmas television films
American fantasy comedy films
American Christmas films
Female bisexuality in film
2010s American films